In mathematics, particularly in the area of functional analysis and topological vector spaces, the vague topology is an example of the weak-* topology which arises in the study of measures on locally compact Hausdorff spaces.

Let  be a locally compact Hausdorff space. By the Riesz representation theorem  is isometric to   The isometry maps a measure  to a linear functional 

It is also not uncommon to define the vague topology by duality with continuous functions having compact support  that is, a sequence of measures  converges vaguely to a measure  whenever the above convergence holds for all test functions  This construction gives rise to a different topology.

One application of this is to probability theory: for example, the central limit theorem is essentially a statement that if  are the probability measures for certain sums of independent random variables, then  converge weakly (and then vaguely) to a normal distribution, that is, the measure  is "approximately normal" for large

See also

References

 .
 G. B. Folland, Real Analysis: Modern Techniques and Their Applications, 2nd ed, John Wiley & Sons, Inc., 1999.

Real analysis
Measure theory
Topology of function spaces